Patrick Rupherford Doyle (born 23 March 1961) is a Nigerian veteran actor and broadcaster who was popular in the 1990s for his roles as a pastor or a religious leader. Doyle originally from Delta state attended Saint Finbarr's College, Akoka and Federal Radio Cooperation Nigeria. He went into broadcasting at the age of 20 where he was working with the Voice of Nigeria (VON) and Nigeria Television Authority before he then became a consultant at Silverbird TV.

Dolyle is married to veteran actress Iretiola Doyle with 5 kids after he lost his first wife to sickle cell anemia in 1999 and his son Raymond in 2009.

Selected filmography

Films 

 Man of God (2022)
 Lady Buckit and the Motley Mopsters (2020)
 Isoken (2017)
 Idahosa Trails (2017)
 The Widow (2015)
 Flower Girl (2013)

Television 
 Ripples
 Castle & Castle
 King of Boys: The Return of the King

Music videos
 Love Medicine - Lorrine Okotie (1990)

References

External links 

 

Living people
1961 births
Nigerian male film actors
20th-century Nigerian male actors
21st-century Nigerian male actors
Nigerian radio presenters
Nigerian media personalities
Nigerian television presenters